Boys on the Docks is a 1997 EP by American Celtic punk band Dropkick Murphys.

Boys on the Docks was the band's first EP; it was released nearly a year before their first full-length studio album, Do or Die. One song from the EP, "Never Alone", also appeared on the full-length album, as did a version of "Boys on the Docks".

The band re-recorded the EP's fourth track, "Caps and Bottles", for their 2001 album, Sing Loud, Sing Proud!. "In the Streets of Boston" was covered by The Business as "In the Streets of London" for their 1999 split album with the Dropkick Murphys, Mob Mentality.

Bassist Ken Casey is the only band member who has been with the band since recording this EP. Drummer Matt Kelly joined shortly after, followed by singer Al Barr in the following year.

Track listing
All songs by Rick Barton and Ken Casey unless otherwise noted.
 "Boys on the Docks" – 2:31
 "Never Alone" – 2:59
 "In the Streets of Boston" (Casey, Close, Mike McColgan) – 1:15
 "Caps and Bottles" – 2:41
 "Eurotrash" (Barton, Casey, McColgan) – 1:48
 "Front Seat" (Barton, McColgan) – 2:19

Credits
Mike McColgan – vocals
Rick Barton – guitar
Ken Casey – bass
Jeff Erna – drums

References

Dropkick Murphys albums
1997 debut EPs
Cyclone Records albums